LaFontaine is a provincial electoral district in Montreal, Quebec, Canada that elects members to the National Assembly of Quebec. It consists of  the neighbourhood of Rivière-des-Prairies in the borough of Rivière-des-Prairies–Pointe-aux-Trembles.

It was created for the 1966 election from a part of Bourget electoral district.

In the change from the 2001 to the 2011 electoral map, its territory was unchanged. From 1992 to 2001, the riding also included the northern half of Pointe-aux-Trembles.

It was named after the First Prime Minister of the United Province of Canada, Louis-Hippolyte Lafontaine.

Members of the Legislative Assembly / National Assembly

Election results

 

* Result compared to Action démocratique

References

External links
Information
 Elections Quebec
 

Election results
 Election results (National Assembly)

Maps
 2011 map (PDF)
 2001 map (Flash)
2001–2011 changes (Flash)
1992–2001 changes (Flash)
 Electoral map of Montréal region
 Quebec electoral map, 2011

Provincial electoral districts of Montreal
Quebec provincial electoral districts
Rivière-des-Prairies–Pointe-aux-Trembles